Delores E. Teutsch (born September 9, 1935) is a former American politician who served as a member of the Washington House of Representatives from 1979 to 1983.  She represented Washington's 45th legislative district as a Republican.  In the 1981 to 1983 term, she served as chair of the Higher Education Committee.

In 1993, governor Mike Lowry appointed Teutsch, along with Hubert Locke and Ruth Coffin Schroeder, to a Citizens Commission on Government Ethics and Campaign Finance Reform to review potential problems in the Public Disclosure Commission's investigation of illegal campaigning.

Outside the legislature, she was affiliated with the Washington Athletic Club and the Business and Professional Women's Club and served on the Board of Trustees of Bellevue Community College.

References

Further reading
 “Legislator will retire and work for change,” by Mike Layton, Seattle Post-Intelligencer, April 4, 1982.
 “Teutsch tired of bucking Republican tide in Olympia,” by Mike Merritt, Journal-American, March 25, 1982.
 “Teutsch leaves politics; Miller is new hopeful,” by Wendy Lippmann, Northshore Citizen, March 8, 1982.
 Ray Moore: An Oral History, interviewed by Sharon Boswell, Washington State Oral History Program, Office of the Secretary of State, 1999

1935 births
Living people
Republican Party members of the Washington House of Representatives
Women state legislators in Washington (state)